Nawayug Shrestha (born 8 June 1990)<ref>{{Cite web|url=http://admin.myrepublica.com/feature-article/story/37170/star-striker-nawayug-s-family-elated-over-nepal-s-victory.html|title=Star Striker Nawug's family elated over Nepal's victory}} My Republica Retrieved 2016-7-10</ref> is a Nepalese international footballer who plays for Nepal Army Club in the top division of the Memorial A-Division League. He was born in Mangalbare, Illam. He went to Bhanubhakta Higher Secondary School. Before school started the principal had to make sure that enough footballs were in the school such was the game's popularity.

International career
Nawayug Shrestha made his international debut in the game against India in the 2016 SAFF Championship held in India.  He scored 3 hat-tricks in a month during January to February 2016. He scored his first international hat-trick against Maldives during the semi final of the Bangabandhu Cup which was held in Bangladesh. He got his second hat-trick against Maldives during the South Asian Games 2016. He increased his hat-trick tally to 3 against Bhutan in the same tournament. He also scored the winning goal against India in the finals. Also he has been playing for Nepal Army Club, one of the domestic football clubs of Nepal.

International goalsScores and results list Nepal's goal tally first.''

References

Nepalese footballers
1990 births
Living people
Nepal international footballers
People from Ilam District
Association football forwards
South Asian Games gold medalists for Nepal
South Asian Games medalists in football